No Way may refer to:

Albums
No Way (album), by Run On, 1997
No Way!, or the title track, by Boogaloo Joe Jones, 1971
No Way, by Geraldine Hunt, 1980

Songs
"No Way" (Rottyful Sky song), 2010
"No Way" (Soulhead song), 2004
"No Way!", by Bazzi from Soul Searching, 2019
"No Way", by Bob Girls, 2014
"No Way", by the Cynics, 1987
"No Way", by David Gilmour from David Gilmour, 1978
"No Way", by the Donkeys, 1980
"No Way", by Fifth Harmony from 7/27, 2016
"No Way", by Humble Pie from Thunderbox, 1974
"No Way", by Korn from Issues, 1999
"No Way", by Krokus from Metal Rendez-Vous, 1980
"No Way", by Lee Hi from 24°C, 2019
"No Way", by Nina Hagen Band from Unbehagen, 1980
"No Way", by Pearl Jam from Yield, 1998
"No Way", by Sonic Youth from The Eternal, 2009
"No Way", by Toni Braxton from Pulse, 2010
"No Way", from the musical Six

See also
"No Way, No Way", a song by Vanilla, 1997